Bonoufla is a village in west-central Ivory Coast. It is located in the sub-prefecture of Vavoua, Vavoua Department, Haut-Sassandra Region, Sassandra-Marahoué District.

Bonoufla was a commune until March 2012, when it became one of 1126 communes nationwide that were abolished.

Notes

Former communes of Ivory Coast
Populated places in Sassandra-Marahoué District
Populated places in Haut-Sassandra